Andrew Russell Bennett (born August 26, 1978) is a former American football wide receiver of the National Football League (NFL). He was signed by the Tennessee Titans as an undrafted free agent in 2001. He played college football at UCLA.

Bennett was also a member of the St. Louis Rams and Baltimore Ravens. He retired prior to the 2009 season due to a knee injury.

Early years
Bennett attended Miramonte High School in Orinda, California, and was a three-sport standout in football, baseball, and basketball. As a senior football quarterback, he won first-team All-League and second-team All-Bay Area honors, after he passed for 2,308 yards and 18 touchdowns and rushed for six touchdowns. In baseball, he batted .430 and won first-team All-League honors.

College career
Bennett was offered a scholarship to play at Princeton University in New Jersey, but turned it down to attend the University of California, Los Angeles (UCLA). He was a walk-on as a quarterback and elected to redshirt the 1996 season. He was awarded a scholarship for the 1997 season and switched positions to become a wide receiver for his junior year. He played both wide receiver and quarterback in his senior season and won the Paul I. Wellman Award for All-Around Excellence. He graduated from UCLA with a major in Political Science, and is also a member of the Sigma Chi fraternity.

Professional career

Tennessee Titans
From 2001 to 2006, Bennett played wide receiver for the Tennessee Titans, becoming a full-time starter. During the 2004 season he tied an NFL record by scoring eight touchdowns in a three-game span.

St. Louis Rams
In 2007, Bennett became a free agent and signed with the St. Louis Rams. He signed a six-year deal worth $30 million, with $10 million guaranteed. He played his two guaranteed seasons with the Rams before being released on February 25, 2009.

Baltimore Ravens
Bennett signed with the Baltimore Ravens on July 24, 2009, to a one-year, $745,000 contract. He retired on July 26, 2009, because a previous knee condition flared up.

Post-NFL career and personal life
Bennett has appeared on ESPN's First Take (hosted by Jay Crawford) as recently as March 24, 2010, as an NFL analyst alongside Bobby Carpenter.

Bennett now resides in San Ramon, California.

References

External links
Player Bio: Drew Bennett – UCLA Official Athletic Site

1978 births
Living people
Players of American football from Berkeley, California
American football wide receivers
UCLA Bruins football players
American football quarterbacks
Tennessee Titans players
St. Louis Rams players
Baltimore Ravens players
People from Orinda, California
Miramonte High School alumni